The Director of Administration and Management, or DA&M, is a position within the Office of the Secretary of Defense (OSD) at the Department of Defense.  As the principal staff assistant and advisor to the Secretary and Deputy Secretary of Defense concerning organizational and administrative management matters, the DA&M is responsible for: developing and maintaining organizational charters and overseeing assigned programs such as DoD Committee Management, DoD Headquarters Management, the OSD Historical Program, the DoD Freedom of Information Act Program, the DoD Privacy Program, the DoD Civil Liberties program, the OSD Internal Management Control Program, and OSD Information Technology/CIO programs. Additionally, the DA&M performs management and oversight responsibilities for the Pentagon Force Protection Agency and the Washington Headquarters Services, a 1,300 employee, $1.3 billion field activity.

Responsibilities

The DA&M has three principal responsibilities: to advise the Secretary and DoD senior leaders team on organizational and management matters of institutional importance; to oversee and provide a range of administrative, logistical, facilities, and technology support to the Pentagon Reservation - the headquarters of the U.S. Defense establishment and a highly visible symbol of U.S. military power - and DoD-leased facilities in the National Capital Region (NCR); and to secure and protect the people, facilities, and infrastructure of the Pentagon Reservation and DoD-leased facilities in the NCR.  Although the DA&M is considered to be part of the OSD, the post does not explicitly require Senate confirmation.

The DoD General Counsel is the Regulatory Policy Officer responsible for monitoring regulatory activities within DoD to ensure uniform compliance with the implementation of executive and legislative requirements and priorities. Nevertheless, the DA&M is considered the "functional proponent" for the DoD Regulatory Program and the Plan, and so oversees the operational requirements of the regulatory process. For example, the retrospective review of DoD rules required by Executive Order 13563 is a "special focus of interest" for the DA&M. EO 13563, signed by President Obama on January 18, 2011, directed all Federal agencies to "promote predictability and reduce uncertainty" in America's regulatory code by ensuring that existing regulations are "accessible, consistent, written in plain language, and easy to understand."

History

This position originated in 1949 as the Assistant Secretary of Defense (Administration and Public Affairs), established as one of the three assistant secretary posts authorized by amendments to the National Security Act (P.L. 81-216, amended 10 August 1949). That post was abolished in 1950, its duties transferred to the Assistant Secretary of Defense (Manpower). In July 1964, the post of Assistant Secretary of Defense (Administration) was established, only to be redesignated in November 1971 as the Deputy Assistant Secretary of Defense (Administration). In May 1988, this office was retitled Director of Administration and Management, per Defense Directive 5105.53.

Office Holders
The table below includes both the various titles of this post over time, as well as all the holders of those offices.

Budget

Budget Totals
The annual budget for the DA&M is contained in the OSD's budget, under the Defense-Wide Operation and Maintenance (O&M) account. The Obama administration is expecting to cut funding for this position by ~18% in FY12. Importantly, this line item does not include funding for personnel compensation or benefits, which comes out of the OSD Core Operating Program.

Budget Functions
The DA&M funding supports the Civil Liberties Office, Defense Privacy Office, Defense Reform Initiative, Defense Historian, and the Directorate for Organizational and Management Planning.

References

External links
 Official website